Court of inquiry may refer to:

 Naval Board of Inquiry  - U.S. court of inquiry into a naval matter relating to ships
 Court of Marine Inquiry - civil courts that investigate matters relating to ships
 Court of inquiry - a court of inquiry by the Sri Lankan Armed Forces is an initial fact-finding inquiry similar to a non-summary inquiry by a Magistrate.